46P/Wirtanen is a small short-period comet with a current orbital period of 5.4 years. It was the original target for close investigation by the Rosetta spacecraft, planned by the European Space Agency, but an inability to meet the launch window caused Rosetta to be sent to 67P/Churyumov–Gerasimenko instead. It belongs to the Jupiter family of comets, all of which have aphelia between 5 and 6 AU. In December 2019, astronomers reported capturing an outburst of the comet in substantial detail by the TESS space telescope.

Discovery 
46P/Wirtanen was discovered photographically on January 17, 1948, by the American astronomer Carl A. Wirtanen. The plate was exposed on January 15 during a stellar proper motion survey for the Lick Observatory. Due to a limited number of initial observations, it took more than a year to recognize this object as a short-period comet.

Perihelion passages 

The July 2013 perihelion passage was not favorable, only reaching a magnitude of 14.7. Between January 23 and September 26 of 2013, the comet had an elongation less than 20 degrees from the Sun.

On 16 December 2018 the comet passed  (≈30.1 LD) from Earth, reaching an estimated magnitude of 4.2, making this pass the brightest one predicted, and the brightest close approach for the next 20 years. Its magnitude could peak as bright as magnitude 3 near its December 16, 2018 closest approach. It was one of the 10 closest comet flybys of Earth in 70 years.

The 2018 close approach, combined with Wirtanen's brightness provides an opportunity to study a potential future spacecraft mission target in detail. A worldwide observing campaign has been organized to capitalize on the favorable circumstances of this apparition.

Exploration proposals

The comet was the target for the proposed Comet Hopper mission, which reached the finalist stage in the NASA Discovery program. It was one of only three missions in that selection to have a more detailed study. The selection process was ultimately won in 2012 by the InSight mission, a Mars lander. The Comet Hopper was designed to use the ASRG, the Advanced Stirling Radioisotope Generator.

The Comet Hopper mission, if it were selected, would have had multiple science goals over the 7.3 years of its nominal lifetime. At roughly 4.5 AU the spacecraft would rendezvous with Comet Wirtanen and begin to map the spatial heterogeneity of surface solids as well as gas and dust emissions from the coma - the nebulous envelope around the nucleus of a comet.  The remote mapping would also allow for any nucleus structure, geologic processes, and coma mechanisms to be determined. After arriving at the comet, the spacecraft would approach and land, then subsequently hop to other locations on the comet. As the comet approached the Sun, the spacecraft would land and hop multiple times. The final landing would occur at 1.5 AU. As the comet approached the Sun and became more active, the spacecraft would be able to record surface changes.

Also, 46P/Wirtanen was the original destination of the European Space Agency's Rosetta spacecraft mission, but launch delays meant that the comet was no longer easily reachable and another periodic comet, 67P/Churyumov–Gerasimenko, was chosen as the mission's target instead.

Associated Piscid meteor shower 
Russian forecaster Mikhail Maslov had predicted that the Earth's orbit would cross Comet Wirtanen's debris stream as many as four times between December 10 and December 14, 2012. As there had not previously been an encounter with this debris stream, it was not certain whether or not a meteor shower would be visible from Earth, but there was speculation that a shower with as many as 30 meteors per hour might occur.

Observers in Australia reported that on the night of December 14, 2012, as many as a dozen meteors were seen emanating from the predicted radiant in the constellation of Pisces.

References

External links 
 IAU Ephemerides page for 46P
 46P on JPL Small-Body Database Browser
 46P/Wirtanen – Seiichi Yoshida @ aerith.net

Periodic comets
0046
046P
+
Comets in 2013
Comets in 2018
19480117